The 2013–14 Borussia Mönchengladbach season was the 113th season in the club's football history. In 2013–14 the club played in the Bundesliga, the top tier of German football. It was the club's sixth consecutive season in this league, having been promoted from the 2. Bundesliga in 2008.

The club also took part in the 2013–14 edition of the DFB-Pokal, where it failed to reach the second round after being defeated by third division side Darmstadt 98.

Matches

Legend

Bundesliga

League table

Matches

DFB-Pokal

Transfers

Summer
In:

Out:

References

http://www.borussia.de/english/season/first-team/resultsfixtures.html

Borussia Mönchengladbach seasons
German football clubs 2013–14 season